The Counterfeit Plan is a 1957 British crime film directed by Montgomery Tully and starring Zachary Scott and Peggie Castle.

Plot summary
A gang of criminals, led by sociopath Max Brant (Zachary Scott), escape from France and set up a counterfeit operation to make British £5 and American $20 notes in the cellar of a large English country house now owned by Louie Bernard (Mervyn Johns). Brant forces Bernard, who worked for the British Government during WW2 making foreign counterfeit currency, to make the master die plates by holding his daughter, Carole (Peggie Castle), an artist, as a hostage. When Bernard finds out that Brant has tried to rape his daughter and has killed his housekeeper, Gerta (Chili Bouchier), because she witnessed the attempted rape, he anonymously posts one of the forged £5 notes to the police with a letter describing the counterfeit operation. When Brant is told about this by Duke (Lee Patterson), he confronts Bernard. Meanwhile, the police slowly close in on the gang's headquarters.

The film features professional snooker world champion Horace Lindrum in a cameo appearance playing himself. This is used as cover for one of the meetings with other criminals to discuss the sale of the forged British £5 notes to them. Another similar meeting is camouflaged as a boxing match.

Cast
Zachary Scott as Max Brant
Peggie Castle as Carole Bernard
Mervyn Johns as Louie Bernard
Sydney Tafler as Harry Flint
Lee Patterson as Duke
Eric Pohlmann as Frank Wandelman
Robert Arden as Bob Fenton
Chili Bouchier as Gerta
John Welsh as Police Inspector Grant
Aubrey Dexter as Joe Lepton
David Lodge as Sam Watson

Production
The film was the first of three between Amalgamated Productions and Anglo-Amalgamated. It was very popular in the UK.

References

External links
 
 
 
 

1957 films
1957 crime drama films
British black-and-white films
British crime drama films
Films directed by Montgomery Tully
Counterfeit money in film
1950s English-language films
1950s British films